Charles Woolley Shepherd (27 February 1887 – 31 July 1968) was a Welsh field hockey player, born in Barbados, who competed in the 1908 Summer Olympics with the Welsh team, which won the bronze medal.

References

External links
 
Charles Shepherd's profile at Sports Reference.com

1887 births
1968 deaths
Welsh male field hockey players
Olympic field hockey players of Great Britain
British male field hockey players
Field hockey players at the 1908 Summer Olympics
Olympic bronze medallists for Great Britain
Olympic medalists in field hockey
Welsh Olympic medallists
Medalists at the 1908 Summer Olympics
Migrants from British Barbados to the United Kingdom